Rodrigue Kossi Fiogbé (born 11 July 2000) is a Beninese professional footballer who plays for Tunisian club Club Africain as a midfielder.

Club career
After beginning his senior club career with Les Buffles FC du Borgou in 2017, Kossi signed for Tunisian club Club Africain in September 2018.

International career
Kossi represented Benin at youth level, and received his first call-up to the senior national team  in March 2019.

He made his Benin national football team debut on 6 September 2019 in a friendly against Ivory Coast, when he substituted Jordan Adéoti in the 82nd minute.

References

2000 births
Living people
Beninese footballers
Buffles du Borgou FC players
Club Africain players
Tunisian Ligue Professionnelle 1 players
Association football midfielders
Beninese expatriate footballers
Beninese expatriate sportspeople in Tunisia
Expatriate footballers in Tunisia
Benin youth international footballers
Benin international footballers
2019 Africa Cup of Nations players